Bloy is a surname. Notable people with the surname include:

Francis Bloy (1904–1993), the Episcopal Bishop of Los Angeles between 1948 and 1974
Harry Bloy (born 1946), former BC Liberal Member of the Legislative Assembly in the province of British Columbia, Canada
Léon Bloy (1846–1917), French novelist, essayist, pamphleteer and poet

de:Bloy